The Beijing Military Region was one of seven military regions for the Chinese People's Liberation Army.  From the mid 1980s to 2017, it had administration of all military affairs within Beijing city, Tianjin city, Hebei province, Shanxi province, and Inner Mongolia Autonomous Region.  The Region is mainly responsible for defending the People's Republic of China from Mongolia and Russia, and also protects the capital of China, and had the largest number of military personnel of any of the seven regions active from 1985-2017. The Region has now been disbanded and superseded by the Central Theater Command and Northern Theater Command.

Both the 63rd and 65th Corps/Group Armies were stationed in the Beijing area after returning from the Korean War and remained in the region ever since, becoming Group Armies after 1985. The 13th Air Force Corps was stationed at Shijiazhuang in Hebei Province from 1971 to 1976.

On 26 October 1988 the 17th Air Division was reorganized into the Beijing MR Training Base (serials 6xx2x).

In reductions announced in September 2003, the 24th Group Army (Hebei), and the 63rd Group Army (Shanxi) were both disbanded. About the same time, the 10th Air Corps, also stationed in the region, was disestablished (PLAAF 2010).

The International Institute for Strategic Studies attributed to the command 300,000 personnel in 2006, consisting of three group armies (the 27th Group Army, 38th Group Army, and the 65th Group Army), two armoured divisions, one mechanised infantry division, five motorised divisions, one artillery division, three armoured, seven motorised infantry, four artillery, a total of five various anti-aircraft brigades, and one anti-tank regiment. The command is also augmented by the PLA Beijing Garrison, which consists of the 1st and 3rd guard divisions (Military Police), and the Beijing Garrison Honor Guard Battalion and Color Guard Company, both of which are charged with public duties. The command is also home to the PLA Navy (PLAN) North Sea Fleet.

The last commander was General Song Puxuan (2014-2016). The political commissar was General Liu Fulian.

History and mission 

The Beijing Military Region traces its lineage to the establishment of the Northwest Military Region in May 1948. It was renamed the Beijing Military Region in 1955, when the Inner Mongolia Military Region was downgraded to a district, and was folded into the Beijing Military Region.

The Beijing Military Region is primarily charged with protecting the capital. Because of its location in the capital, the Beijing Military Region was the most important of the seven military regions. Each unit from the Beijing Military Region contributed forces to Beijing for the crackdown on the Tiananmen Square protests of 1989, and these elements remained deployed in Beijing long after using deadly force to remove the demonstrators.

In addition to guarding the capital, the Beijing Military Region is also in charge of training key personnel for leadership positions through the numerous military academies in the region.

Commanders
Yang Chengwu (1955-1958)
Yang Yong (1958-1963)
Zheng Weishan (1963-1971)
Li Desheng (1971-1974)
Chen Xilian (1974-1980)
Qin Jiwei (1980-1987)
Zhou Yibing (1987-1990)
Wang Chengbin (1990-1993)
Li Laizhu (1993-1997)
Li Xinliang (1997-2002)
Zhu Qi (2002-2007)
Fang Fenghui (2007-2012)
Zhang Shibo (2012-2014)
Song Puxuan (2014-2016)

Structure
The organizational structure as of 2016 was as follows:

Leadership
Commander 
Deputy Commanders
Regional Chief-of-Staff 
Political Commissar Fu Tinggui 
Deputy Political Commissars
Political Department Director 
Headquarters Department
 HQ Battalion

Direct Troops
27th Group Army
 Army HQ
 Army HQ Battalion
38th Group Army
65th Group Army

PLA Beijing Garrison 
1st Guard Division
Beijing Garrison Honor Guard Battalion 
3rd Guard Division
17th Guard Regiment

Nickname
Organizations affiliated with the Beijing Military Region often use the nickname "comrade", including the Comrade Performance Troupe and the Comrade Newspaper.

References 

 
Military regions of the People's Liberation Army
Military units and formations established in 1955
Military units and formations disestablished in 2016
1955 establishments in China